Robin James Francis (born 20 April 1982) is a South African-born former international swimmer who represented Great Britain for over ten years, competing at the Olympic Games, World and European Championships. He had an illustrious Junior International career winning individual Youth Olympic and Junior European medals. He dominated the medley disciplines for over four consecutive years as Senior British Champion and multiple record holder. Robin's 400m medley SC British record stood for six years.

As a Senior International, Francis was a two-time European silver medallist in the 400 metre individual medley (2001, 2003).  He also won silver at the 2004 World Championships in the same event. His 2001 performance was the fifth fastest in history and ranked him second in the world. As a result, he was awarded with the prestigious 'Best International Newcomer' Award. He was consistently ranked inside the top two by the FINA world rankings and in 2003 went underneath the long-standing European SC record held by Dutch great Marcel Wouda. Olympic and World Record holder Lazlo Czech set the new record by narrowly beating Francis.

At the 2003 World Championships in Barcelona, Francis was drafted in at short notice to compete in the men's 4 x 200-metre freestyle relay. He posted the fastest team split of 1.48.53 helping his team finish sixth and achieve Great Britain a place on the 2004 Olympic programme.

At the 2004 Olympic Games in Athens, Francis competed in the men's 200-metre individual medley, reaching the semi-final, and the 400-metre individual medley finishing 12th. He chose not to compete in the men’s  freestyle at the Olympic trials as the event clashed with his individual ones. The men’s team ended up placing fourth.

Francis retired from swimming in 2006 at the age of 23 and turned his attention to strength and conditioning, coaching and mentoring. Francis has successfully headed programmes in South Africa and the UK, and spent four years at Kelly College (now Mount Kelly) developing and leading the Performance Squad both as a swimming and strength and conditioning coach. During this time he successfully coached Hannah Russell MBE to become World Champion and multi medallist in the 2013 IPC World Championships in Montreal, Canada.

Francis is a full blue recipient from the University of Bath where he previously resided with his daughter. This was his third post as a qualified teacher, whilst leading Malmesbury Marlins Amateur Swimming Club as their Head Coach.

Francis is now Head of Swimming at Ashford School in Kent (England) as of summer 2022, where he directs a programme that has produced multiple national-level swimmers within a Sports Faculty becoming increasingly recognised nationally for its sporting excellence and achievements in both team and individual sports.

External links 
 http://www.robinfrancisfitness.co.uk
 http://www.swimcampsuk.co.uk
 https://www.ashfordschool.co.uk/
 https://www.ashfordschool.co.uk/senior-school/sport/
 https://www.ashfordschool.co.uk/new-swimming-head-coach/

1982 births
Living people
British male swimmers
Olympic swimmers of Great Britain
Swimmers at the 2004 Summer Olympics
Medalists at the FINA World Swimming Championships (25 m)